Danzishi is a metro station on the Loop Line of Chongqing Rail Transit in Nan'an District of Chongqing Municipality, China.

It serves the area surrounding the Danzishi CBD, including nearby office buildings and residential blocks.

The station opened on July 1st, 2019.

Station Structure

Floors

Loop Line Platform
Platform Layout
2 side platforms are in use for Loop Line trains travelling in both directions.

Exits
There are a total of 4 entrances/exits for the station, with Exit 1 currently under construction.

Exit 2 opened with a makeshift passageway due to construction setbacks on the actual exit.

Surroundings

Nearby Places
Chaotianmen Bridge
Danzishi Middle School
Chongqing No.11 Middle School
Dafoduan Primary School
Tenglong Avenue
Qunhui Road
Weiguo Road

Nearby Stations
Tushan station (a Loop Line station)
Wulidian station (a Loop Line & Line 6 station)

See also
Chongqing Rail Transit (CRT)
Loop Line (CRT)
Chaotianmen Bridge

References

Railway stations in Chongqing
Railway stations in China opened in 2019
Chongqing Rail Transit stations